A list of Kannada language films produced in the Kannada film industry in India in 2010.
 Films are generally released every Friday
 In addition films can be released on specific festival days.

Released films
A total of 137 films were released in the year 2010

List of released films
The following is a list of films produced in the Kannada film industry in India in 2010, presented in alphabetical order.

Released films

January–June

July–December

Notable deaths

See also

 Kannada films of 2011
 Kannada films of 2009
 Cinema of Karnataka

References

External links
Kannada films of 2010 at the Internet Movie Database
Kannada movies released in 2010 at Oneindia.in

2010
Lists of 2010 films by country or language
2010 in Indian cinema